The Catholic Church in the Central African Republic is part of the worldwide Catholic Church, under the spiritual leadership of the Pope in Rome.

There are about 950,000 Catholics in the country which represents 29% of the total population. There are nine dioceses including one archdiocese: In 2015 Pope Francis made a visit to Bangui.

Bangui
Alindao
Bambari
Bangassou
Berbérati
Bossangoa
Bouar
Kaga–Bandoro
Mbaïki

References

External links
 http://www.catholic-hierarchy.org/country/cf.html

 
Central African
Central African